The 2018 Big East men's basketball tournament was the postseason tournament men's basketball tournament for the Big East Conference. It was held from March 7 through March 10, 2018 at Madison Square Garden in New York City. No. 2 seed Villanova defeated No. 5 seed Providence in the championship game to win the tournament and receive the conference's bid to the NCAA tournament. It was Villanova's second straight tournament championship.

Providence participated in three straight overtime games in the tournament, setting a Big East tournament record.

Seeds
All 10 Big East schools participated in the tournament. Teams were seeded by the conference record with tie-breaking procedures to determine the seeds for teams with identical conference records. The top six teams received first-round byes. Seeding for the tournament was determined at the close of the regular conference season. Notably, no Big East team had secured its tournament seed before the final day of the 2017–18 regular season.

Schedule

Bracket

* denotes overtime period

See also
2018 Big East women's basketball tournament

References

Tournament
Big East men's basketball tournament
Basketball competitions in New York City
College sports tournaments in New York City
Sports in Manhattan
Big East men's basketball tournament
Big East men's basketball tournament
2010s in Manhattan